The 1993 New Year Honours in New Zealand were appointments by Elizabeth II on the advice of the New Zealand government to various orders and honours to reward and highlight good works by New Zealanders. The awards celebrated the passing of 1992 and the beginning of 1993, and were announced on 31 December 1992.

The recipients of honours are displayed here as they were styled before their new honour.

Knight Bachelor
 The Honourable John Francis Jeffries – lately a judge of the High Court.
 Gordon Charles Mason . For services to local government.

Order of Saint Michael and Saint George

Companion (CMG)
 Professor Margaret Clark. For services to education.
 The Right Honourable David Spence Thomson . For public services.

Order of the British Empire

Dame Commander (DBE)
Civil division
 Reubina Ann Ballin . For services to the community.
 Helen June Patricia Evison . For services to theatre, television and the community.
 Thea Dale, Lady Muldoon . For services to the community.

Commander (CBE)
Civil division
 Mary Valerie Eliason . For services to Country Women's Institutes.
 John Edward Keaney . For services to local-body and community affairs.
 John Anderson Jamieson  – Commissioner of Police, New Zealand Police.
 Emeritus Professor Nancy Joan Kinross. For services to nursing and nursing education.
 Dr Dorothy Field Usher Potter. For services to ophthalmology.
 Aroha Hohipera Reriti-Crofts. For services to the Māori people and the community.
 Esme Irene Tombleson . For services to multiple sclerosis and the community.
 Edward James Tonks. For services to rugby.
 Noel Henry Yarrow . For services to the baking industry, export and the community.

Military division
 Commodore Kevin Frederick Wilson  – Royal New Zealand Navy.

Officer (OBE)
Civil division
 Brian Shields Armstrong . For services to the New Zealand Fire Service.
 Muriel Dorothy Butler. For services to children's literature.
 Michael Armstrong Collins  – lately director-general, Department of Scientific and Industrial Research.
 Peter David Cox. For services to the travel and tourist industries.
 Dr Keith Douglas Drayton. For services to medicine and the community.
 Vivienne Mary (Vicky) Duncan. For public services.
 Ann Jocelyn Gluckman . For services to education and the community.
 Mary Patricia Hanrahan (Sister Mary Hanrahan). For services to education.
 Harold Ashworth Holmes  . For services to the community.
 Meredith Jane Hunter. For services to the viticultural industry.
 Joanne Robin Morris. For public services.
 Dr Claudia Josepha Orange. For services to historical research.
 Wendy Ross. For services to the community.
 Horace Noel (Sonny) Sciascia . For services to local government and sport.
 John Carl Sexton. For services to the disabled.
 Dr Warwick Mayne Smeeton. For services to sports medicine.
 Douglas Alexander Smith. For services to business management.
 Nadja Tollemache. For services to the law.

Military division
 Captain David Ninian Wood – Royal New Zealand Navy.
 Colonel David John Grant – Colonels' List, New Zealand Army.

Member (MBE)
Civil division
 Erin Margaret Baker. For services as a triathlete.
 Philippa June Baker. For services to rowing.
 Margaret Orpah Cleland . For services to the community.
 Rona Davis. For services as a speech and drama teacher.
 Reginald James Denny . For services to local government.
 Perilyn Drysdale. For services to manufacturing and export.
 John Albert Fauvel. For services to Toastmasters International.
 Henry (Harry) Neville Haythorne. For services to ballet.
 Charles Christianson Hood  – lately general manager, Waikeria Prison, Department of Justice.
 Ian Alexander Hope. For services to the community.
 Barbara Anne Kendall. For services to boardsailing.
 Angus MacAulay. For services to piping.
 Thomas Wilford McKay. For services to local government and the community.
 Roy Alexander McLennan. For services to local-body and community affairs.
 John Edwin Heremaia Marsh . For services to the Māori people and the community.
 Lorraine Mary Moller. For services to athletics.
 John Lawrence Murray. For services to farming and the community.
 Jennifer Frances Newstead. For services to sport.
 Betty (Jan) Nigro. For services to art.
 John William Rose. For services to the community.
 Violet Schaper. For services to the blind.
 Dr William Joseph Smith. For services to leprosy control and the community.
 Lilian Valder. For services to the community.
 Margaret Alxiere Yelverton (Mrs Yates). For services to the hairdressing industry.

Military division
 Lieutenant Commander Susan Jane Taylor – Royal New Zealand Navy.
 Captain and Quartermaster William John Lillicrapp – New Zealand Special Air Service.
 Squadron Leader Michael Philip Pullar – Royal New Zealand Air Force.

British Empire Medal (BEM)
Military division
 Chief Petty Officer Denis Kean – Royal New Zealand Naval Volunteer Reserve.
 Flight Sergeant John Paul Fleming – Royal New Zealand Air Force.

Companion of the Queen's Service Order (QSO)

For community service
 Annette Marie Green (Sister Annette Green).
 Peter Millais Harcourt.
 Valerie Gladys Newman.
 Major Thelma Florence Smith.
 Joan Therese Timpany (Sister Joan Timpany).

For public services
 Maureen Parker Howe.
 Professor Tīmoti Samuel Kāretu.
 Dr Susan Mary Lojkine.
 Brian Peter MacDonell.
 Charles Ernest Poynter .
 Wilson Ernest Still.
 Joan Eileen Williamson .

Queen's Service Medal (QSM)

For community service
 Catherine Heather Allan .
 Ivy Frances Ball .
 Dorothy May Billington.
 Charles Harry Raymond Chester.
 Raymond Henry Churchill .
 Edward John Churchouse.
 Ruth Shirley Clarke.
 Leslie William, Coffman.
 Judith Cossey.
 Peter Leonard Dimond .
 Bevan Thomas Dunlop.
 Ranji Wilcox Ford.
 Lorna Elizabeth Arlow Galbraith.
 Jack Gee .
 Jane Ellinore Ginn.
 Michael Kenneth Gray.
 Agnes Mary Hall.
 Irene Mary Hawkins.
 Charles Murray Hercus.
 Gerald Norman Janes.
 Judith Anne Keaney.
 Margaret Joy Llewellyn Lewis-Benneworth (Joy Lewis).
 Hector Cunningham Low.
 Frances Jill McIvor.
 Frederick Charles Munting.
 Allison Doreen Nicol.
 Evelyn Priscilla Ogilvie.
 Arthur Gordon Parry .
 Murray John Paterson.
 Molly Elizabeth Smith.
 Connie Stephens.
 Edith Anne Stubbersfield .
 Edith Clifton Walkley.
 Huia Annie Welsh.

For public services
 Thomas William Robert Abbott .
 Richard Samuel Anstis .
 Mary Bourke – office manager, Parliamentary Counsel Office.
 Allan Walter Brewster .
 Bruce Neville Broderson.
 The Venerable Gordon Alexander (Peter) Butt.
 Ivan James Dickinson.
 Daniel Patrick Fouhy .
 Maata Fuimaono.
 The Reverend Father Francis Patrick Garty.
 Murray Ross Gallagher – detective, New Zealand Police.
 Gordon Grantham – sergeant, New Zealand Police.
 James Browning Hay .
 Vye Anne Hepburn.
 Pieternella (Nell) Immink.
 Helen Marie Jarvie.
 Harry Alfred, Johansen .
 Amy Jones.
 Te Aomuhurangi Te Maaka Jones .
 Thomas Andrew Kincaid.
 Peter Alex Lea.
 Valerie Louise Lundy.
 Jessie Edith McHardy.
 Lorna Betsy McMillan.
 Jack Brayshaw Midgley  .
 Judith Christine Owen.
 Audrey Patricia Simm.
 Iolanthe Small.
 Ropata Wahawaha Stirling.
 Douglas James Truman.
 Maryrose Wilson.
 Hilary Wooding .

Queen's Fire Services Medal (QFSM)
 Hugh Carl Baker  – senior station officer, Haumoana Volunteer Fire Brigade, New Zealand Fire Service.
 John Braidwood – chief fire officer, Alexandra Volunteer Fire Brigade, New Zealand Fire Service.
 Kenneth McLeay Watkins – chief fire officer, Te Puke Volunteer Fire Brigade, New Zealand Fire Service.

Queen's Police Medal (QPM)
 Graeme George Cleland – sergeant, New Zealand Police.

Air Force Cross (AFC)
 Wing Commander Brian Carruthers – Royal New Zealand Air Force.

Queen's Commendation for Valuable Service in the Air
 Flight Lieutenant Ian Aubrey Tuke – Royal New Zealand Air Force.

References

New Year Honours
1993 awards
1993 in New Zealand
New Zealand awards